Light and Lively is an album by the drummer Louis Hayes, recorded in 1989 and released on the Danish SteepleChase label.

Reception 

The AllMusic review called the album "another good one".

Track listing 
 "Light and Lively" (Louis Hayes) – 12:27
 "If You Could See Me Now" (Tadd Dameron, Carl Sigman) – 8:25
 "Enchantment" (Horace Silver) – 6:13
 "The 10th Dimension" (Clint Houston) – 11:57 Bonus track on CD
 "For the Love of What" (Charles Tolliver) – 6:21
 "Darian" (Houston) – 9:48
 "Blues for Macao" (Houston) – 10:26

Personnel 
Louis Hayes – drums
Charles Tolliver – trumpet
Bobby Watson – alto saxophone
Kenny Barron – piano
Clint Houston – bass

References 

Louis Hayes albums
1989 albums
SteepleChase Records albums